Crazylegs is a 1953 film about Elroy Hirsch's football career. In college (University of Wisconsin and University of Michigan) his unconventional dynamic running style allowed him to change directions in a multitude of ways. The media dubbed him "Crazylegs". The name stuck all through his professional career and life. The bulk of this film is centered on his college days.  Crazylegs later became part of the foundation of the "Three End" with the LA Rams.  This film captures the genuine quality of Hirsch's personality, with Hirsch playing himself in the part.

The film premiered in Wausau, Wisconsin, Hirsch's hometown. Cotton Warburton's editing was nominated for the Academy Award for Best Film Editing.

Plot
Elroy Hirsch's life is told from his days in a school in Wisconsin and then at the University of Wisconsin where he already excelled in sports. After military service, Elroy becomes a professional athlete and earns the nickname of Crazylegs, by which he became known internationally. An injury almost ends his career, but in a typical case of personal overcoming, he achieves a triumphant return.

Cast

External links
 

1953 films
1950s biographical drama films
American biographical drama films
American football films
Biographical films about sportspeople
American black-and-white films
Films directed by Francis D. Lyon
Films scored by Leith Stevens
Republic Pictures films
1953 directorial debut films
1953 drama films
1950s English-language films
1950s American films